Capecitabine, sold under the brand name Xeloda among others, is a anticancer medication used to treat breast cancer, gastric cancer and colorectal cancer. For breast cancer it is often used together with docetaxel. It is taken by mouth.

Common side effects include abdominal pain, vomiting, diarrhea, weakness, and rashes. Other severe side effects include blood clotting problems, allergic reactions, heart problems such as cardiomyopathy, and low blood cell counts. Use during pregnancy may result in harm to the fetus. Capecitabine, inside the body, is converted to 5-fluorouracil (5-FU) through which it acts. It belongs to the class of medications known as fluoropyrimidines, which also includes 5-FU and tegafur.

Capecitabine was patented in 1992 and approved for medical use in 1998. It is on the World Health Organization's List of Essential Medicines.

Medical uses
Capecitabine is indicated for
 adjuvant treatment of people with Stage III colon cancer as a single agent or as a component of a combination chemotherapy regimen;
 perioperative treatment of adults with locally advanced rectal cancer as a component of chemoradiotherapy;
 treatment of people with unresectable or metastatic colorectal cancer as a single agent or as a component of a combination chemotherapy regimen;
 treatment of people with advanced or metastatic breast cancer as a single agent if an anthracycline- or taxane-containing chemotherapy is not indicated;
 treatment of people with advanced or metastatic breast cancer in combination with docetaxel after disease progression on prior anthracycline-containing chemotherapy;
 treatment of adults with unresectable or metastatic gastric, esophageal, or gastroesophageal junction cancer as a component of a combination chemotherapy regimen;
 treatment of adults with HER2-overexpressing metastatic gastric or gastroesophageal junction adenocarcinoma who have not received prior treatment for metastatic disease as a component of a combination regimen;
 adjuvant treatment of adults with pancreatic adenocarcinoma as a component of a combination chemotherapy regimen.

Adverse effects
Adverse effects by frequency:

Very common (>10% frequency)

 Appetite loss
 Diarrhea
 Vomiting
 Nausea
 Stomatitis
 Abdominal pain
 Fatigue
 Weakness
 Hand-foot syndrome
 Oedema
 Fever
 Pain
 Headache
 Hair loss
 Dermatitis
 Indigestion
 Shortness of breath
 Eye irritation
 Myelosuppression

Notes on adverse effects:

Contraindications
Contraindications include:
 History of hypersensitivity to fluorouracil, capecitabine or any of its excipients
 DPD deficiency (see Pharmacogenetics)
 Pregnancy and lactation
 Severe leucopenia, neutropenia, or thrombocytopenia
 Severe hepatic impairment or severe renal impairment
 Treatment with sorivudine or its chemically related analogues, such as brivudine

Drug interactions
Drugs it is known to interact with include:
 Sorivudine or its analogues, such as, brivudine.
 CYP2C9 substrates, including, warfarin and other coumarin-derivatives anticoagulants
 Phenytoin, as it increases the plasma concentrations of phenytoin.
 Calcium folinate may enhance the therapeutic effects of capecitabine by means of synergising with its metabolite, 5-FU. It may also induce more severe diarrhoea by means of this synergy.

Pharmacogenetics
The dihydropyrimidine dehydrogenase (DPD) enzyme is responsible for the detoxifying metabolism of fluoropyrimidines, a class of drugs that includes capecitabine, 5-fluorouracil and tegafur. Genetic variations within the DPD gene (DPYD) can lead to reduced or absent DPD activity, and individuals who are heterozygous or homozygous for these variations may have partial or complete DPD deficiency; an estimated 0.2% of individuals have complete DPD deficiency. Those with partial or complete DPD deficiency have a significantly increased risk of severe or even fatal drug toxicities when treated with fluoropyrimidines; examples of toxicities include myelosuppression, neurotoxicity and hand-foot syndrome.

Mechanism of action

Capecitabine is metabolised to 5-FU which in turn is a thymidylate synthase inhibitor, hence inhibiting the synthesis of thymidine monophosphate (ThMP), the active form of thymidine which is required for the de novo synthesis of DNA.

Drug synthesis

Society and culture

Brand names 

One of the brand names is Xeloda, marketed by Genentech.

Others include Xitabin, Capcibin, Kapetral and Pecaset by Eurolab.

References

Further reading

External links 
 

Carbamates
Fluoropyrimidines
Genentech brands
Hoffmann-La Roche brands
Organofluorides
Prodrugs
Pyrimidine antagonists
Pyrimidones
Specialty drugs
World Health Organization essential medicines
Wikipedia medicine articles ready to translate